Jean-François Berthet (born 23 August 1969) is a French yacht racer who competed in the 1996 Summer Olympics.

References

External links
 
 
 

1969 births
Living people
French male sailors (sport)
Olympic sailors of France
Sailors at the 1996 Summer Olympics – 470
420 class world champions
470 class sailors
World champions in sailing for France
20th-century French people